Pieter verLoren van Themaat (16 March 1916 – 4 July 2004) was a Dutch law professor, civil service worker, and Advocate-General of the European Court of Justice.

Biography
VerLoren was born in Rotterdam in 1916. Shortly after his birth the family moved to Nijmegen, where his mother soon died while VerLoren was only four years old. The family, part Dutch VerLoren family then once again moved, this time to the newly constructed house Grandpré Molière in the nearby village of Berg en Dal. After finishing his secondary education at the gymnasium in Nijmegen verLoren wished to become an architect. The Great Depression however made such an impression on him that he wished to help in making a societal effort in avoiding or tempering future crises. VerLoren thus chose to study law at Leiden University. He earned his Master of laws degree in 1939. He wished to work on his doctoral thesis on international tax law under the supervision of professor Ben Telders (nl). During World War II he was nominally working for the Government Agency for Iron and Steel (Rijksbureau voor IJzer en Staal), while writing his doctoral dissertation on treaties of the elimination of double tax regimes. On 2 April 1946 he earned his doctorate cum laude from Leiden University under the supervision of E.M. Meijers, as Ben Telders had died shortly before the liberation in Bergen-Belsen concentration camp. VerLoren then started working for the Ministry of Economic Affairs.

In 1958 VerLoren moved to Brussels to work for the then recently founded European Economic Community. He was made Director General of the department of competition. Together with European Commissioner Hans von der Groeben he worked on Council Regulation 17/62, which served for forty years as an important foundation of the procedural aspects of European Union competition law. In 1967 he returned to the Netherlands and was appointed Professor of socio-economic law at Utrecht University, the first professor in this subject area in the Netherlands. In 1981 he reached the age of retirement and became Emeritus Professor. In 1982, he was presented with a Liber Amicorum, Barents (ed), In Orde (Kluwer, Deventer, 1982).

As a result of the accession of Greece to the European Communities in 1981 an expansion in the number of Advocates-General at the European Court of Justice from four to five took place. This new position would rotate among the smaller Member States and it was agreed that it would be first handed to the Netherlands. The Dutch cabinet saw VerLoren as an excellent candidate and he duly became an Advocate-General at the European Court of Justice on 4 June 1981. He served until 13 January 1986.

In 1974 VerLoren was elected a member of the Royal Netherlands Academy of Arts and Sciences.

Personal life
In 1942 he married Marijke Losecaat Vermeer, to whom he was married for over sixty years.

Memberships
 Member of the Royal Netherlands Academy of Arts and Sciences

Works
  P.J.G. Kapteyn & P. VerLoren van Themaat, Introduction to the Law of the European Communities (1972, 1998, 1989); subsequently ' 'Introduction to the Law of the European Union and the European Communities' ' (2008)

References

1916 births
2004 deaths
Lawyers from Rotterdam
Dutch civil servants
Dutch legal scholars
Leiden University alumni
Academic staff of Utrecht University
Members of the Royal Netherlands Academy of Arts and Sciences
Advocates General of the European Court of Justice
Dutch officials of the European Union